The Things We Did Last Summer is the second studio pop album by singer and actress Shelley Fabares released in 1962 on Colpix Records. It was available in both mono and stereo, catalogue numbers CP-431 and SCP-431.
The album was produced and arranged by Stu Phillips who had produced her previous record. It peaked on the Billboard 200 Chart at #121 in October 1962. The album features her Top 40 hit single "Johnny Loves Me". It also includes the second hit single from the album, "The Things We Did Last Summer".

Reception
The Things We Did Last Summer was released in September 1962. One month after its release the album charted at #121 on the Billboard 200 Chart. The first single taken from The Things We Did Last Summer was "Johnny Loves Me". The song was released a few months ahead of the album and was the follow-up  single to her previous hit "Johnny Angel" from her debut album Shelley!. "Johnny Loves Me" charted on the Billboard Hot 100 pop chart at number 21 in July 1962. It also peaked at number 7 on the Adult Contemporary Chart. The second single taken from the album was "The Things We Did Last Summer" which peaked at #46 on the Billboard Hot 100.

Track listing

Side 1

Side 2

Charts

Re-release
The Things We Did Last Summer was released on compact disc in its entirety for the first time as part of a 2 LPs on 1 CD set that also featured her debut solo album Shelley!. It was released by Collectables in September 2000 and included the original liner notes from the original 1962 recording.

References

1962 albums
Shelley Fabares albums
Colpix Records albums